Michalik or Michalík is a West Slavic surname meaning Michal family. Notable people with the surname include:

 Alexis Michalik (born 1982), actor, scriptwriter and director
 Art Michalik (1930–2021), American football player
 Jan Michalik (born 1948), Polish sport wrestler
 Jessica Michalik (1985–2001)
 Józef Michalik (born 1941), Polish archbishop
 Krystian Michalik (born 1944), Polish footballer 
 Ľubomír Michalík (1983, Čadca), Slovak footballer
 Mário Michalík (born 1973), Slovak football goalkeeper 
 Michal Michalík (born 1980), Czech modern pentathlete
 Monika Michalik (born 1980), Polish sport wrestler
 Pavol Michalík (born 1951), Slovak football goalkeeper
 Piotr Michalik (born 1957), Polish wrestler 
 Rastislav Michalík (born 1974), Slovak footballer
 Tadeusz Michalik, Polish sport wrestler

Other
 Jama Michalika
 Mihalik

Czech-language surnames
Polish-language surnames
Slovak-language surnames
Surnames from given names